Nana Atta Wusu Yiakosan was the leader of Akyem Abuakwa as a vassal of the Ashanti Empire up until 1811. In 1811 he led a rebellion against the Ashanti rule in his area, in which at least 100 Ashanti were killed.

His rebellion was then suppressed by an army led by Opoku Frefre.

References

Sources
Larry W. Yarak. Asante and the Dutch, 1744-1873. Oxford: Clarendon Press, 1990. p. 37.

Year of birth missing
Year of death missing
Ashanti Empire